William M. Williams Jr. was a member of the Wisconsin State Assembly.

Biography
Williams was born on July 11, 1846, in Lake, Milwaukee County, Wisconsin. During the American Civil War, he served with the 1st Wisconsin Heavy Artillery Regiment of the Union Army, achieving the rank of sergeant.

Political career
Williams was a member of the Assembly in 1882. Additionally, he was Postmaster of Oak Creek, Wisconsin. He was a Republican.

References

People from Milwaukee County, Wisconsin
Republican Party members of the Wisconsin State Assembly
Wisconsin postmasters
People of Wisconsin in the American Civil War
Union Army soldiers
1846 births
Year of death missing
People from Oak Creek, Wisconsin